Mark R. Hughes (born October 13, 1973) is an American former mixed martial artist. He trained with the Miletich Fighting Systems along with his twin brother, UFC Hall of Famer and former two-time UFC Welterweight Champion, Matt Hughes.

Mark and Matt competed in a wrestling tournament at their school and ended up facing off in the finals. Mark won the match, showcasing both his wrestling prowess and the strength that the Hughes brothers are known for.

Soon after fighting in the UFC, Mark decided that it just wasn't for him and he went back to his family, the farm and his construction company (Hughes Construction).

Personal life
Mark is five minutes younger than his twin brother Matt. Matt and Mark have an older sister, Beth Ulricy.

Mark and his wife Emily have two sons and one daughter.
Mark also holds a black belt in Brazilian jiu-jitsu and was a division 1 level wrestler.

Mixed martial arts record

|-
| Win  
|align=center| 6–2
| Leo Sylvest 
| Submission (armbar) 
| Extreme Challenge 51 
| 
|align=center| 1 
|align=center| 4:49
|Saint Charles, Illinois, United States
|
|-
| Loss 
|align=center| 5–2
| Joe Geromiller 
| Submission (rear-naked choke) 
| Extreme Challenge Trials: 2000 US MMA National Championships 
| 
|align=center| 2 
|align=center| 4:12
|Springfield, Illinois, United States
|
|-
| Win 
|align=center| 5–1
| Alex Stiebling 
| Decision (unanimous)
| UFC 28
| 
|align=center| 2 
|align=center| 5:00 
|Atlantic City, New Jersey, United States
|
|-
| Win 
|align=center| 4–1
| Matthew Torrez 
| Decision (unanimous) 
| Extreme Challenge 36 
| 
|align=center| 1  
|align=center| 15:00
|Davenport, Iowa, United States
|
|-
| Win 
|align=center| 3–1
| Andrew Neil 
| TKO (submission to punches) 
| Extreme Challenge 36 
| 
|align=center| 1 
|align=center| 1:29
|Davenport, Iowa, United States
|
|-
| Win 
|align=center| 2–1
| Neal Binkley 
| TKO (punches) 
| Extreme Challenge 33 
| 
|align=center| 1 
|align=center| 1:01
|Council Bluffs, Iowa, United States
|
|-
| Win 
|align=center| 1–1
| Ron Fields 
| TKO (punches) 
| Extreme Challenge 32 
| 
|align=center| 1 
|align=center| 1:46
|Springfield, Illinois, United States
|
|-
| Loss 
|align=center| 0–1
| Brian Gassaway 
| Decision (split) 
| JKD Challenge 3
| 
|align=center| N/A 
|align=center| N/A
|Chicago, Illinois, United States
|

References

External links
 Official website
 
 

1973 births
Living people
Twin sportspeople
Identical twins
American male mixed martial artists
Mixed martial artists from Illinois
Middleweight mixed martial artists
Mixed martial artists utilizing wrestling
Mixed martial artists utilizing Brazilian jiu-jitsu
American practitioners of Brazilian jiu-jitsu
People awarded a black belt in Brazilian jiu-jitsu
American twins
People from Hillsboro, Illinois
Ultimate Fighting Championship male fighters